Richard William Guy (4 August 1877 – 1938) was an English professional footballer who played as an outside right for Bradford City and Leeds City in the Football League.

Personal life 
Guy enlisted in the Special Reserve in March 1908 and he served for a year on the Western Front in the Duke of Lancaster's Own Yeomanry during the First World War.

Career statistics

References 

English footballers
Manchester City F.C. players
Bradford City A.F.C. players
Leeds City F.C. players
English Football League players
Association football outside forwards
1877 births
1938 deaths
Sportspeople from Shropshire
Hastings & St Leonards United F.C. players
Portsmouth F.C. players
British Army personnel of World War I
Duke of Lancaster's Own Yeomanry soldiers